BIY is the code for the Bingley railway station in West Yorkshire, England.

Biy may also refer to:

 biy, historically, an elected judge and administrator in Kazakhstan
 biy, the ISO 639 code for the Birhor language, a Munda language of India

See also
 BYI (disambiguation)
 BII (disambiguation)
 Bi (disambiguation)
 Bié (disambiguation)
 Buy (disambiguation)
 By (disambiguation)